Royal Daring Club Molenbeek was a football team from the city of Brussels, Belgium until .

History
Daring Brussels were formed in 1895 and after absorbing other local clubs in 1920 they became Royal Daring Club Molenbeek.

It had to wait until 1936 to come back at the top and win its fourth championship, and the fifth came a year later.  In 1938, it finished 2nd.  The next season saw a poor performance by Daring to finish 13th (forelast).  The club was relegated just before the competition was stopped because of World War II.  The team changed its name to Royal Daring Club de Bruxelles in 1950.  Twenty years later, the name was finally changed to Royal Daring Club Molenbeek before the club merged with matriculation n°47 Royal Racing White to become R.W.D. Molenbeek in 1973.  Since then, the matriculation n°2 was erased.

Honours

Belgian First Division
Champions: 1911–12, 1913–14, 1920–21, 1935–36, 1936–37
Belgian Second Division
Winners: 1954–55, 1958–59
Belgian Cup
Winners: 1934–35
Runners-up: 1969–70

Coupe Jean Dupuich
Winners (2): 1923 and 1924 (shared)
Runner-up (4): 1912, 1914, 1920 and 1922

European cup history

References

 Daring history

Association football clubs established in 1895
Daring Club
Association football clubs disestablished in 1973
1895 establishments in Belgium
1973 disestablishments in Belgium
Organisations based in Belgium with royal patronage
Belgian Pro League clubs